My Babe is an album by saxophonist Bunky Green recorded in Chicago in 1960 but not released on the Vee-Jay label until 1965. It was also released on the label subsidiary Exodus Records in 1966.

Reception

Allmusic reviewer Jim Todd  called it a "superior hard bop date" stating "Green's sound is distinguished by a finely controlled, soft articulation. It's not the squealing, serpentine legato of Eric Dolphy, but there are similarities. Green's approach allows him to play continuous streams of ideas rippled with the modulations of his subtle tonguing".

Track listing 
All compositions by Bunky Green, except where indicated.
 "My Babe" (Traditional) – 6:32
 "Polka Dots and Moonbeams" (Jimmy Van Heusen, Johnny Burke) – 4:53
 "Counter Punch" – 4:12
 "Step High" – 5:29
 "Don't Blame Me" (Dorothy Fields, Jimmy McHugh) – 9:04
 "Cecile" (Donald Byrd) – 04:38

Personnel 
Bunky Green - alto saxophone
Donald Byrd – trumpet
Jimmy Heath – tenor saxophone 
Wynton Kelly  – piano
Larry Ridley – bass
Jimmy Cobb – drums

References 

1965 albums
Vee-Jay Records albums
Bunky Green albums